The Sluagh (English: 'host, army, crowd'), or Sluagh na marbh ('host of the dead'), were the hosts of the unforgiven dead in Irish and Scottish folklore. In the words of British folklorist Lewis Spence, "In the Western Isles of Scotland the Sluagh, or fairy host, was regarded as composed of the souls of the dead flying through the air, and the feast of the dead at Hallowe'en was likewise the festival of the fairies." Usually taking a crescent form, similar to a flight of grey birds, they were said to be able to approach and pick up a person from any direction and then transport them far away through the air, from one island to another. Although they would sometimes rescue humans from dangerous rock clefts, they were generally portrayed as dangerous to mortals.

Etymology
The Scottish Gaelic name  stems from the Old Irish  (≈ ), meaning 'host, army; crowd, assembly'. It derives from the Proto-Celtic root * (cf. Gaul. 'troops of combat', Middle Welsh  'troop', Old Bret. - 'army'), whose original meaning may have been 'those serving the chief', by comparing with Balto-Slavic words that probably emerged from early linguistic contacts with Celtic speakers in Central-Eastern Europe: e.g. Lithuanian  ('service, servitude'), or Old Church Slavonic  ('servant').

In popular culture
In the Legacy of Kain video game series, Sluagh are among the enemies that Raziel encounters in the Spectral Realm. They are scavenging, animalistic creatures that prey on souls and usually prefer to flee from Raziel unless cornered or in a group. Raziel can easily weaken them into a transparent state in which he can devour them to replenish his own health.

Within the VR motion ride Battle for Eire at Busch Gardens Williamsburg, the Sluagh are the minions of the evil villain Balor in the ride's story.

In the roleplay game Household by Two Little Mice the Slaughs are little peoples that lives in the Basement.

See also
 Fairy
 Classifications of fairies
 Restless ghost
 Wild Hunt

References

Bibliography

 
 
 

Aos Sí
Fairies
Fantasy creatures
Irish folklore
Irish legendary creatures
Irish words and phrases
Mythological monsters
Scottish mythology
Scottish folklore
Scottish legendary creatures
Tuatha Dé Danann
Undead